Bellvitge | Rambla Marina is a Barcelona Metro station, in the L'Hospitalet de Llobregat municipality of the Barcelona metropolitan area, and named after the nearby neighbourhood of Bellvitge. The station is served by line L1.

Bellvitge | Rambla Marina metro station is located under Rambla de la Marina and can be accessed from both sides of the road.

The station opened in 1989, when line L1 was extended from Avinguda Carrilet station to Hospital de Bellvitge station.

See also
List of Barcelona Metro stations
Transport in L'Hospitalet de Llobregat

References

External links

Trenscat.com

Barcelona Metro line 1 stations
Railway stations in Spain opened in 1989
1989 establishments in Catalonia
Railway stations in L'Hospitalet de Llobregat